Donoe is a settlement on the island of Saint Thomas in the United States Virgin Islands.

The Home Depot is located in Donoe.

References

Populated places in Saint Thomas, U.S. Virgin Islands
Tutu, U.S. Virgin Islands